Nordkapp (or ;  or ) is a municipality in Troms og Finnmark county, Norway. The administrative centre of the municipality is the town of Honningsvåg, where most residents live. Other settlements in Nordkapp include the villages of Gjesvær, Kåfjord, Kamøyvær, Kjelvik, Nordvågen, Repvåg, Skarsvåg, and Valan.

The  municipality is the 127th largest by area out of the 356 municipalities in Norway. Nordkapp is the 228th most populous municipality in Norway with a population of 2,947.

Some 200,000 tourists visit Nordkapp annually during the two to three months of summer. The main tourist attractions are the North Cape and the nearby Knivskjellodden. The North Cape first became famous when the English explorer Richard Chancellor rounded it in 1553 while attempting to find a sea route through the Northeast Passage. Helnes Lighthouse is located at the entrance to the Porsangerfjorden.

General information

On 1 July 1861, the northern district of the municipality of Kistrand was separated to form the new municipality of Kjelvik. Initially, the municipality encompassed the land on both sides of the northern end of the Porsangerfjorden, including the eastern part of the island of Magerøya, and it had a population of 345. The name of the municipality was changed from Kjelvik to Nordkapp in 1950. On 1 January 1984, the western part of the island of Magerøya as well as the small surrounding islands of Gjesværstappan (population: 240) were transferred from Måsøy Municipality to Nordkapp Municipality.

On 1 January 2020, the municipality became part of the newly formed Troms og Finnmark county. Previously, it had been part of the old Finnmark county.

Name
Nordkapp is a Norwegianized form of the English name North Cape by which the area was historically known dating back to at least 1553. The municipality was originally named Kjelvik, after the main fishing village for the parish. But that village was totally destroyed by the Germans in 1944 and it was never rebuilt. As a consequence of this the municipality changed the name to Nordkapp in 1950.

Coat of arms
The coat of arms was granted on 19 October 1973. The official blazon is "Per fess angeled Or and gules". This means the arms have a field (background) that is divided by an angeled line. Above the line the field has a tincture of Or which means it is commonly colored yellow, but if it is made out of metal, then gold is used. Below the line, the field has a tincture of gules (red). The arms are designed to look like a simplified silhouette of the North Cape, a large cliff in Nordkapp Municipality that is traditionally taken to be the northernmost point in Norway and of the European continent. The red and yellow colors are meant to show the sea under a golden sky representing the midnight sun. The arms were designed by Hallvard Trætteberg.

Churches
The Church of Norway has one parish within the municipality of Nordkapp. It is part of the Hammerfest prosti (deanery) in the Diocese of Nord-Hålogaland.

Government
All municipalities in Norway, including Nordkapp, are responsible for primary education (through 10th grade), outpatient health services, senior citizen services, unemployment and other social services, zoning, economic development, and municipal roads. The municipality is governed by a municipal council of elected representatives, which in turn elect a mayor.  The municipality falls under the Hammerfest District Court and the Hålogaland Court of Appeal.

Municipal council
The municipal council  of Nordkapp is made up of 19 representatives that are elected to four year terms. The party breakdown of the council is as follows:

Mayors
The mayors of Nordkapp (incomplete list):
2019–present: Jan Olsen (SV)
2007-2019: Kristina Hansen (Ap)
2003-2007: Ulf Syversen (Ap)
1999-2003: Bernt-Aksel Jensen (Ap)

Geography

The municipality encompasses the island of Magerøya, but also parts of the mainland on the Porsanger Peninsula and Sværholt Peninsula on both sides of the Porsangerfjorden. There are many other fjords in the municipality including Duksfjorden, Kåfjorden, Kamøyfjorden, and Skipsfjorden. The main island is Magerøya and there are a few islands located around Magerøya including Gjesvær, Gjesværstappan, Lille Kamøya, and Store Kamøya.

North Cape

The municipality is named after Nordkapp (North Cape), a  cliff that is commonly referred to as the northernmost point of Europe. If Europe's northernmost point is allowed to be on an island, then it still is not the North Cape. It would be Cape Fligely on Rudolf Island, Franz Josef Land in Russia, which is located much further north at 81° 48′ 24″ N. If Franz Josef Land is not considered to be in Europe, then Europe's northernmost point is the northern point of the island of Rossøya, an islet in Svalbard, north of Spitsbergen at 80° 49′ 44.41″ N.

Birdlife

This coastal municipality is like many others in Finnmark, home of large seabird colonies. The island group known as Gjesværstappan is one of the better known with at least 2,500 pairs of razorbill. Away from the coast it is the typical tundra habitat of the region that dominates with lakes, marshes, and areas of willow scrub. Many of the lakes hold breeding wildfowl, with species like long-tailed duck being found.

Climate
The populated areas of Nordkapp municipality have a subarctic climate (Dfc) with long, moderately cold winters and short, cool summers. If February were slightly warmer it would be a subpolar oceanic climate (Cfc). The well known North Cape plateau (cliff) is at 307 m ASL and will be colder with a tundra climate.

Transportation
Due to the heavy tourist traffic in the summers, Nordkapp has an extensive transportation infrastructure for such a small, remote municipality. The Honningsvåg Airport is located just north of the town of Honningsvåg, with daily connections to Tromsø. The European route E69 highway runs north throughout the municipality from Porsanger to the North Cape. The North Cape Tunnel connects the mainland to the island of Magerøya. The Honningsvåg Tunnel goes through a large mountain near Honningsvåg.

Notable people 

 Thor With (1918 in Honningsvåg - 1987) a theologian and Bishop of the Diocese of Bjørgvin
 Terje Stigen (1922 on Magerøya – 2010) a Norwegian author
 Idar Kristiansen (1932 in Honningsvåg – 1985) a poet, novelist and short story writer
 Gunnar Stålsett (born 1935 in Nordkapp) a theologican and politician; leader of the Centre Party & Bishop of Oslo
 Knut Erik Jensen (born 1940 in Honningsvåg) a Norwegian film director 
 Ingunn Utsi (born 1948 in Repvågstranda) a Sami sculptor, painter and book illustrator
 John Arne Markussen (born 1953 in Repvåg) a Norwegian journalist and newspaper editor
 Guri Berg (born 1963) a Norwegian artist and sculptor, grew up in Honningsvåg
 Ingeborg Arvola (born 1974 in Honningsvåg) a Norwegian novelist and children's writer
 William Frantzen (born 1993) a Norwegian retired footballer, grew up in Honningsvåg

References

External links

Municipal fact sheet from Statistics Norway 
Pictures from North Cape and Skarsvåg
Motorbike travel from Italy to Nordkapp
From Nordkapp to Italy by bike
Nordkapp by rail
360x180° Panoramen from Nordkapp
6-day road trip from The Netherlands to the Nordkapp

 
Municipalities of Troms og Finnmark
Populated places of Arctic Norway
1861 establishments in Norway

bg:Нордкап